The McRae Formation is a geological formation exposed in southern New Mexico whose strata date back to the Late Cretaceous. Dinosaur remains are among the fossils that have been recovered from the formation.

Description
The formation consists of a basal conglomerate interbedded with shale and siltstone and a sequence of alternating sandstone and shale. The lower conglomerates contain volcanic debris, while the upper beds contain sparse nonvolcanic rock fragments. The shales are reddish brown to purplish while the sandstones are light gray. The sandstones are medium bedded to massive and sometimes form hogbacks. The formation is present around Elephant Butte Reservoir, in the Caballo Mountains, and under much of the Jornada del Muerto. It overlies the Mesaverde Group, from which it derives much of its sediments. It is overlain by the Love Ranch Formation.

The formation is divided into the lower Jose Creek Member and upper Hall Lake Member. The Jose Creek member is interpreted as mudflow or alluvial fan deposits emplaced in a humid tropical to semitropical environment. It includes distinctive breccia conglomerate beds.

Fossil evidence firmly establishes that most of the McRae Formation is late Cretaceous in age. However, it is possible that some of the uppermost beds extend into the Paleocene.

Fossil content 
The formation contains a floral assemblage that includes Geinitzia cf. formosa, Canna magnifolia, Phyllites cf. ratonensis, Salix, Cinnamomum, Sabalites montana, Araucarites longifolia, Ficus planicostata, and Sequoia.

Vertebrate paleofauna 
W.T. Lee found a ceratopsian skeleton in the area in 1905. Additional vertebrate fossil fragments have been found at twelve locations, generally along the contact between the Jose Creek and Hall Lake members, that include ceratopsian frill and jaw fragments, ankylosaur armor fragments, a sauropod femur, and an incomplete jaw of Tyrannosaurus (found by a yachtsman in 1983.) Turtle fossils have also been unearthed here.

Tyrannosaurus imperator
Triceratops sp.
Torosaurus sp. 
Alamosaurus sp.

History of investigation
The formation was first named by V.C. Kelley and Caswell Silver in 1952 for Fort McRae. They designated the type location as the base of Elephant Butte and the eastern shore of Elephant Butte Reservoir. H.P. Bushnell divided the formation into members in 1955.

Kenneth Segerstrom and his coinvestigators argued in 1979 that the beds of the Cub Mountain Formation properly belong to the McRae Formation. Spencer G. Lucas and his coinvestigators disagreed on the basis of fossil evidence, placing the former formation in the Eocene.

In 2019, Lucas and his coinvestigators proposed promoting the McRae Formation to group rank and adding the Double Canyon Formation as its uppermost member.

See also 
 List of dinosaur-bearing rock formations
 Kirtland Formation

References

Bibliography 
 
 
 
 
 
 
 
 
 
 

Cretaceous formations of New Mexico
Maastrichtian Stage of North America
Sandstone formations of the United States
Shale formations of the United States
Conglomerate formations
Tuff formations
Fluvial deposits
Lacustrine deposits
Paleontology in New Mexico